Clidicus is a rove beetle genus in the family Staphylinidae.

Species
 Clidicus abbotensis
 Clidicus aliquantulus
 Clidicus bellator
 Clidicus crocodylus
 Clidicus formicarius
 Clidicus grandis
 Clidicus laticeps
 Clidicus loebli
 Clidicus monstrosus
 Clidicus mussardi
 Clidicus mysorensis
 Clidicus omoios
 Clidicus quadricollis
 Clidicus rufescens
 Clidicus taphrocephalus
 Clidicus termitophilus
 Clidicus tonkinensis
 †Clidicus balticus

References

External links 
 iNaturalist (World Checklist)

Staphylinidae genera
Scydmaeninae